Calgary Montrose was a provincial electoral district in Calgary, Alberta, Canada, mandated to return a single member to the Legislative Assembly of Alberta using the first past the post method of voting from 1986 to 2012.

History
This urban district located in central east Calgary was created in the 1986 boundary re-distribution from Calgary-McCall. The district elected Progressive Conservative candidates for its entire history.

The district has seen its share of controversial elections in recent years. The last representative was Manmeet Bhullar, who won his first term in office in a controversial race over Independent Ron Leech in the 2008 general election. The previous representative was Hung Pham, who served from 1993 to 2004.

The Calgary-Montrose electoral district would be dissolved in the 2010 Alberta boundary re-distribution and would be re-distributed into the Calgary-East, Calgary-Greenway and Calgary-Cross electoral districts.

Boundary history

Electoral history
The electoral district was created in the 1986 boundary redistribution. The first election held that year saw Progressive Conservative candidate Rick Orman win a comfortable majority to pick up the seat for his party. He was easily re-elected in the 1989 general election with a larger majority. Orman retired from the legislature at dissolution in 1993.

The 1993 election saw Progressive Conservative candidate Hung Pham win a sizable majority to hold the seat for his party. He was re-elected three more times winning in the 1997, 2001 and 2004 general elections. He retired from the legislature in 2008 after a bitter fall out with the Progressive Conservatives.

The 2008 election saw Progressive Conservative candidate Manmeet Bhullar win a hotly contested race over Independent Ron Leech. The pair had been in a disputed nomination race before the general election with the PC constituency association choosing Leech and the party hand-choosing Bhullar as the representative. Leech would petition the Alberta Court of Queen's Bench to overturn the results of the election with allegations that Bhullar and his supporters spurring ineligible voters to cast ballots, interfering with and influencing ballots cast, and violating the secrecy of the voting process.

Election results

1986 general election

1989 general election

1993 general election

1997 general election

2001 general election

2004 general election

2008 general election

Senate election results

2004 Senate nominee election district results

Voters had the option of selecting 4 Candidates on the Ballot

2004 Student Vote

On November 19, 2004, a Student Vote was conducted at participating Alberta schools to parallel the 2004 Alberta general election results. The vote was designed to educate students and simulate the electoral process for persons who have not yet reached the legal majority. The vote was conducted in 80 of the 83 provincial electoral districts with students voting for actual election candidates. Schools with a large student body that reside in another electoral district had the option to vote for candidates outside of the electoral district then where they were physically located.

See also
List of Alberta provincial electoral districts

References

Further reading

External links
Elections Alberta
The Legislative Assembly of Alberta

Former provincial electoral districts of Alberta
Politics of Calgary